Donald Metz (born 24 November 1940) is an architect known for his earth-integrated house that was built in the 1970s to take advantage of thermal insulation.

"The Metz House" was featured in Xanadu: The Computerized Home of Tomorrow describing its similarities to the Xanadu House. Metz lives with his family in Lyme, New Hampshire.

References

External links
http://www.donmetzarchitect.com

1940 births
American architects
Living people
People from Lyme, New Hampshire